An equestrian statue of José María Morelos, officially named Monumento a Morelos, is installed in Guadalajara, in the Mexican state of Jalisco. It was designed by Miguel Miramontes and it was unveiled in September 1965. It is installed along Parque Morelos, previously named Paseo de la Alameda. The bronze statue is placed in front of a quarry obelisk. Above the main statue, there is a bronze eagle that represents one of the former coats of arms of the country.

See also

 1965 in art
 List of equestrian statues

References

External links
 

1965 establishments in Mexico
1965 sculptures
Bronze sculptures in Mexico
Equestrian statues in Mexico
Monuments and memorials in Jalisco
Obelisks
Outdoor sculptures in Guadalajara
Sculptures of men in Mexico
Sculptures of birds